"Netzel is a German, Polish family name. (also Nötzel) nickname for a person in need or distress, from Middle High German not ‘hardship’, ‘distress’, ‘suffering’.possibly from a pet form of Notz, a short form of the personal name Norbert.southern metonymic occupational name for a maker of nets, from Middle High German netzel(in), a diminutive of Netzel.

Notable people sharing the surname Netzel
 Laura Netzel - Swedish composer
 Milo Netzel - MLB first baseman
 Wilhelm Netzel -  Swedish gynecologist and obstetrician

References

Patronymic surnames
Surnames of German origin